Mohammed Ali El Khider (born 10 February 1985, in Khartoum) (known as Mohammed Safari)     is a Sudanese footballer who plays for Al-Ahly Shendi.

Career
The defender is known for his rough slide tackling and he plays at the heart of the defence.

International career
He also plays for the Sudan National Team, usually wearing the number four shirt. He represented his country at multiple youth levels.

References

1985 births
Living people
Sudanese footballers
Sudan international footballers
2008 Africa Cup of Nations players
2011 African Nations Championship players
Al-Merrikh SC players
Al-Ahly Shendi players
Association football defenders
Sudan A' international footballers